Keith J Harrison (born 28 March 1933) is a former British cyclist.

Career
He competed in the sprint event at the 1956 Summer Olympics.

He represented England and won a silver medal and a bronze medal in the 10 mile scratch and 1km time trial respectively at the 1954 British Empire and Commonwealth Games in Vancouver, Canada. He also represented England in three more events at the 1958 British Empire and Commonwealth Games in Cardiff, Wales.

References

External links
 

1933 births
Living people
British male cyclists
Olympic cyclists of Great Britain
Cyclists at the 1956 Summer Olympics
Sportspeople from Birmingham, West Midlands
Commonwealth Games medallists in cycling
Commonwealth Games silver medallists for England
Commonwealth Games bronze medallists for England
Cyclists at the 1954 British Empire and Commonwealth Games
Medallists at the 1954 British Empire and Commonwealth Games